Treaty of Copenhagen may refer to:
 Treaty of Copenhagen (1441), a peace treaty ending the Dutch–Hanseatic War
 Treaty of Copenhagen (1468), by which Margaret of Denmark, was betrothed to James III of Scotland 
 Treaty of Copenhagen (1660), a peace treaty in the Second Northern War
 Treaty of Copenhagen (1670), a treaty of commerce and alliance between Denmark-Norway and Great Britain
 Treaty of Copenhagen (1709), an alliance in the Great Northern War
 Copenhagen Convention of 1857 governing transit passage through the Danish straits, whereby a group of shipping nations bought out the Sound Dues in the Øresund
 Copenhagen Accord, a document adopted at United Nations Climate Change Conference 2009

See also 
 Copenhagen Convention (disambiguation)